The Malaysia national cricket team represents the country of Malaysia in international cricket matches. They have been an associate member of the International Cricket Council (ICC) since 1967.

History

Early days
Cricket has been played in what is now Malaysia since the 1880s. Various teams represented Malaya, the Federated Malay States and the Straits Settlements, formed in 1884 by the British, Royal Selangor Club (RSC) is the first cricket club founded in present Malaysia (locally called a padang also in Singapore e.g. Padang, Singapore).
The Singapore Cricket Club, a former affiliate of the Malayan Cricket Association, is the oldest cricket club in the region (founded in 1852).

The first recorded match was between Selangor and Malacca in 1887. The Selangor-Singapore series was played in 1891.
Cricket in Johor was played in the early 20th century, but the first recorded cricketing event is the visit of the Australian team led by C. G. Macartney in 1927. Penang is another historical cricket venue in Malaysia where cricket has been played from British times. The Penang Sports Club was established in the early 1900s.
On 6 June 1927 Malaya beat Australia by 39 runs to make history.
Lall Singh became the first Malaysia born test player (played for India in their debut Test at Lord's against England in 1932).

After World War II, cricket grew in popularity, leading to the founding of the Malayan Cricket Association (MCA) in 1948. Regional cricket associations like Sabah, Sarawak and Singapore joined and in 1963, the MCA was renamed the Malaysian Cricket Association. In 1965, the  independence of Singapore led its association to leave the MCA.

The first team to represent Malaysia was in 1970, three years after the MCA became an ICC associate member, when it played an MCC side captained by Tony Lewis in a two-day match, losing by 230 runs. The same year, Malaysia played the first Saudara Cup match against Singapore, drawing the three-day match.

The Saudara Cup match continued annually, and in 1979 Malaysia participated in the first ICC Trophy, failing to progress beyond the first round, a performance they repeated in 1982 and 1986. They reached the plate competition in 1990 and 1994.

1990s
The first Stan Nagaiah Trophy was played in Singapore in February 1995 with Singapore beating Malaysia 2–1 in the three match one-day series. After winning the Stan Nagaiah Trophy and drawing the Saudara Cup match in 1996 Malaysia hosted the first ACC Trophy tournament, finishing third in their first round group.

Malaysia began to host major international tournaments in 1997, starting with the 1997 ICC Trophy in which Malaysia finished 16th after losing a play-off to Namibia. They played one season in Pakistani domestic cricket in 1998, losing all four of their preliminary round matches. Cricket made its first and, to date, only appearance in the Commonwealth Games later that year, with Malaysia hosting that year's games. The cricket tournament saw Malaysia participate as hosts though they lost all three of their first round matches. They reached the final of the ACC Trophy that same year, losing to Bangladesh.

21st century

2000–2017
In 2000, Malaysia reached the semi-final of the ACC Trophy before losing to hosts the UAE. They failed to progress beyond the first round of the 2001 ICC Trophy and lost to Nepal in the semi-finals of the 2002 ACC Trophy.

Malaysia played their first first-class matches in 2004 as part of that year's ICC Intercontinental Cup. They lost to both Nepal and the UAE and failed to reach the semi-final stage of the tournament. Malaysia hosted the ACC Trophy in 2004, which was the first stage of qualification for the 2005 ICC Trophy and the 2007 World Cup, finishing joint seventh with Bhutan. They finished last in the ACC Fast Track Countries Tournament in 2004, thus failing to qualify for the 2005 ICC Intercontinental Cup. They played in the tournament again in 2005, this time finishing third.

In 2006, Malaysia competed in the ACC Premier League, finishing fourth. They again hosted the ACC Trophy that year, again finishing seventh after beating Qatar in a play-off.

Malaysia have played in the ACC Twenty20 Cup thrice. They did not win a match in 2007 but finished seventh in 2009 after winning 3 Group B matches and a positional playoff against Saudi Arabia.

In 2011, they finished sixth after winning 4 Group A matches and losing a positional playoff against UAE.

In August 2017, Malaysia won two medals in cricket at the 2017 Southeast Asian Games. They won the gold medal in the 50-over tournament and the silver medal in the 20-over tournament.

2018-Present
In April 2018, the ICC decided to grant full Twenty20 International (T20I) status to all its members. Therefore, all Twenty20 matches played between Malaysia and other ICC members after 1 January 2019 will be a full T20I. 

Malaysia played their first T20I on 24 June against Thailand during the 2019 Malaysia Tri-Nation Series.

After April 2019, Malaysia will play in the 2019–21 ICC Cricket World Cup Challenge League.

Grounds 

 Kinrara Academy Oval, Kuala Lumpur
 Bayuemas Oval, Kuala Lumpur
 Selangor Turf Club, Selangor
 Royal Selangor Club, Selangor
 UKM-YSD Cricket Oval, Bangi

Tournament history

World Cricket League
 2009 Division Six: Fourth place
 2011 Division Six: Second place – promoted
 2012 Division Five: Second place – promoted
 2012 Division Four: Fifth place – relegated
 2014 Division Five: Second place – promoted
 2014 Division Four: Champions – promoted
 2014 Division Three: Third place
 2017 Division Three: Sixth place – relegated
 2018 Division Four: Third place

Commonwealth Games
 1998: First round

ICC Intercontinental Cup
 2004: First round
 2005: Did not qualify
 2006/07: Did not participate

ICC Trophy
 1979: First round
 1982: First round
 1986: First round
 1990: Plate competition
 1994: Plate competition
 1997: 16th place
 2001: First round
 2005: Did not qualify

ACC Fast Track Countries Tournament
 2004: 5th place
 2005: 3rd place
 2006: 4th place

ACC Trophy
 1996: First round
 1998: Runners up
 2000: Semi-finals
 2002: Semi-finals
 2004: 7th place
 2006: 7th place
 2008 Elite: 6th place
 2010 Elite: 4th place
 2012 Elite: 4th place
 2014 Premier League Elite: 6th place

Asia Cup Qualifier 
2018: 5th place
2020: Did not qualify

ACC Eastern Region T20
 2018: Did not participate
 2020:  3rd place

ACC Twenty20 Cup
 2007: First round
 2009: 7th place
 2011: 6th place
 2013: First round
 2015: 5th place

Asian Games
 2010: Quarter-finals
 2014: Quarter-finals

Arafura Games
 2007: Silver medal

ACC U/19 Cup
 2014: 8th place

Records and statistics
International Match Summary — Malaysia
 
Last updated 12 March 2023

Twenty20 International 
 Highest team total: 213/4 v. Bhutan on 2 July 2022 at UKM-YSD Cricket Oval, Bangi.  
 Highest individual score: 96, Zubaidi Zulkifle  v. Bhutan on 2 July 2022 at UKM-YSD Cricket Oval, Bangi, and Virandeep Singh v. Bahrain on 19 December 2022 at UKM-YSD Cricket Oval, Bangi.
 Best individual bowling figures: 5/4 , Khizar Hayat v. Hong Kong on 20 February 2020 at Kinrara Academy Oval, Kuala Lumpur.

Most T20I runs for Malaysia

Most T20I wickets for Malaysia

T20I record versus other nations

Records complete to T20I #2022. Last updated 12 March 2023.

Other records
Performances by Malaysian cricketers in World Cricket League matches and ACC Premier League matches, as of 29 June 2014

Centuries

Nasir Shafiq – 151* vs Cayman Islands at Bayuemas Oval, Kuala Lumpur on 7 March 2014

Rakesh Madhavan - 129 vs Hong Kong at KOCU Ground, Ahmadi City on 9 April 2010

Suresh Navaratnam - 115 vs Nepal at KOCH Ground, Ahmadi City on 7 April 2010

Rakesh Madhavan – 115* vs Botswana at Kallang Ground, Singapore on 3 September 2009

Suhan Alagaratnam - 107 vs Singapore at Bayuemas Oval, Kuala Lumpur on 1 August 2008

Ahmed Faiz – 103 vs Guernsey at Kinrara Academy Ground, Kuala Lumpur on 10 March 2014

Rakesh Madhavan – 102* vs Tanzania at Selangor Turf Club, Kuala Lumpur on 9 September 2012

Rakesh Madhavan - 101 vs Saudi Arabia at Kinrara Academy Oval, Kuala Lumpur on 30 July 2008

Suhan Alagaratnam - 100 vs Saudi Arabia at Kinrara Academy Oval, Kuala Lumpur on 30 July 2008

5 wicket hauls

Dinesh Sockalingham - 6/39 vs U.A.E at Selangor Turf Club, Kuala Lumpur on 29 July 2008

Nazril Rahman - 5/18 vs Oman at Sheikh Zayed Stadium, Abu Dhabi on 6 October 2012

Anwar Rahman - 5/27 vs Maldives at Sharjah Cricket Stadium, Sharjah on 7 October 2012

Eszrafiq Aziz – 5/36 vs Fiji at Kinrara Academy Oval, Kuala Lumpur on 20 September 2011

Hassan Mohammed – 5/49 vs Botswana at Kallang Ground, Singapore on 3 September 2009

Shahrulnizam Yusof - 5/49 vs Italy at Indian Association Ground, Singapore on 25 June 2014

Khizar Hayat – 5/62 vs Jersey at Kinrara Academy Ground, Kuala Lumpur on 13 March 2014

Scorer
Manogaran Manickam—Ex-Malaysian Cricket Player and Scorer

Current squad
This lists all the players who have played for Malaysia in the past 12 months or has been part of the latest One-day or T20I squad. Updated as of 23 December 2022.

Tournaments
 Malaysia hosted the 2014 ICC World Cricket League Division Three in October.

See also
 List of Malaysia Twenty20 International cricketers
 Malaysia national women's cricket team
 Malaya cricket team
 Federated Malay States cricket team
 Straits Settlements cricket team
 List of Malaysian Junior Cricketers

References

External links
 Official website

Cricket in Malaysia
National cricket teams
Cricket
Malaysia in international cricket